Clara Barton is an unincorporated community located within Edison Township in Middlesex County, New Jersey, United States. It takes its name from Clara Barton.

Located in the eastern part of the sprawling township, Clara Barton is more urban in its density and has a small central business district on Amboy Avenue. The "village-like" section of it is separated from the township's bustling highways and stretches of retail and is home to one of the township's three public libraries. The Middlesex Greenway runs through the neighborhood.

See also
List of neighborhoods in Edison, New Jersey

References

Neighborhoods in Edison, New Jersey
Unincorporated communities in Middlesex County, New Jersey
Unincorporated communities in New Jersey
New Jersey